Shua , or Shwakhwe, is a Khoe language (Central Khoisan) of Botswana. It is spoken in central Botswana (in Nata and its surroundings), and in parts of the Chobe District in the extreme north of Botswana. There are approximately 6,000 speakers (Cook 2004) and approximately 2,000 out of those 6,000 speakers are native speakers. The linguistic variety spoken in the township of Nata in northeast Botswana is highly endangered and spoken fluently only by adults over about thirty years of age. The term Shwakhwe means people (khwe) from the salty area (shwa).

Phonology

Consonants 

 // is only phonemic in the Ts'ixa and Danisi dialects only.

Vowels 
Shua has the five vowels , and three nasal vowels .

Syntax
Unlike most Khoisan languages, but like Nama, the most neutral word order is SOV, though word order is relatively free. As with most Khoisan languages, there are postpositions. There is a tense-aspect marker ke which often appears in second position in affirmative sentences in the present tense, giving X Aux S O V order (e.g. S Aux O V).

This marker appears first in certain subordinate clauses in a manner reminiscent of V2 languages such as German, where a clause-initial complementizer is in complementary distribution with a second position phenomenon (in German, it would be the finite verb which appears in second position).

Numerals

Shua has indigenous terms for numeral terms, it is a restrictive and limited system of numerals.

 |uˉiˉ ‘one’
 |am ‘two’
 ngona: ~ ‖obeˉ:ˉ ‘three’
 hatsa: ‘four’
 |’oˉra: ‘a few’
 ‖hara: ‘many’ 

Using this example, the numeral comes before the head noun. More specifically, it appears in the second "opening" of a noun phrase "following a demonstrative or determiner (if there is one), and preceding a qualifying nominal or adjective."

Dialects
Shua is a dialect cluster. 
Deti (10 or fewer speakers)
Ganádi
Shwa-khwe
Nǀoo-khwe
Kǀoree-khoe or ǀOree-khwe
ǁʼAiye or ǀAaye
ǀXaise or ǀTaise
Tshidi-khwe or Tcaiti or Sili or Shete Tsere
Danisi or Demisa or Madenasse or Madinnisane
Cara
ǁGoro or ǀXaio

The term Hietshware (Hietʃware, Hietʃo) is used for varieties of both Shua and its sister-language Tshwa.

Tsʼixa (200 speakers) is evidently a distinct language.

References

External links
Shua basic lexicon at the Global Lexicostatistical Database

Khoe languages
Languages of Botswana